Aerolíneas Ejecutivas S.A de C.V is an executive travel operator based in Toluca. It operates charter, VIP and air taxi service. At one time, it also held a subsidiary called MexJets.

History
The airline was established in 1968 as an air taxi operator, originally named Aerotaxis de México and flew with a Learjet 23 and 24 aircraft. In 1980,the airline was renamed as Aerolíneas Ejecutivas and commenced to operate charters and VIP services and during the 90's decade, it continued operating air taxi, VIP and charter services. By 1994 the airline signed a contract with Hawker Beechcraft to buy Beechcraft aircraft, which replaced the Learjets. In 1998 subsidiary MexJets was created. In 2000, it established a Beechcraft Technical Service Center at Toluca. By 2005 the airline signed a contract with Agusta Westland to acquire their products and 2 years later, during 2007, it signed a contract with Enstrom.

Fleet

Helicopters
AgustaWestland AW109 (both Power and Grand versions)
AgustaWestland AW119
AgustaWestland AW139
Enstrom 280
Enstrom 480
Enstrom F-28

Propellers
Beechcraft 200
Beechcraft 350
Beechcraft Baron
Beechcraft Bonanza
Beechcraft C90GTi

Jets
Beechcraft Premier (all versions from I to II)
Hawker 400
Hawker 4000
Hawker 750
Hawker 900XP

References

External links
 Official website

Charter airlines of Mexico
Airlines established in 1968
Airlines of Mexico
1968 establishments in Mexico
Mexican brands